Stanisław Kalemba (born 25 October 1947), is a Polish politician. He was elected to Sejm on 25 September 2005, getting 7,830 votes in 38 Piła district as a candidate from the Polish People's Party list.

He was also a member of Sejm 1991–1993, Sejm 1993–1997, Sejm 1997–2001, and Sejm 2001–2005.

See also
Members of Polish Sejm 2005–2007

External links
Stanisław Kalemba - parliamentary page - includes declarations of interest, voting record, and transcripts of speeches.

Members of the Polish Sejm 2005–2007
Members of the Polish Sejm 1991–1993
Members of the Polish Sejm 1993–1997
Members of the Polish Sejm 1997–2001
Members of the Polish Sejm 2001–2005
Polish People's Party politicians
1947 births
Living people
Agriculture ministers of Poland
People from Poznań County
Members of the Polish Sejm 2007–2011
Members of the Polish Sejm 2011–2015